Dååth  is an American heavy metal band from Atlanta. Their music incorporates styles such as death metal, industrial metal, and some traces of gypsy jazz.

History 
Dååth was started by Eyal Levi and Mike Kameron, who had been playing in bands since they were in middle school. The two friends attended Berklee College of Music in Boston but eventually left school to concentrate full-time on making money. The band was originally known as Dirt Nap before the name change in 2004.

Dååth's first album, Futility, was self-released in 2004. Their Roadrunner Records debut, The Hinderers, was released in March 2007. Dååth have so far released two music videos from The Hinderers, the first being "Festival Mass Soulform", which was created prior to getting signed, and helped them gain Roadrunner's interest. The second video, "Subterfuge", was released in February 2007.

In March 2007, Dååth was confirmed to play the second stage (rotating slots) at Ozzfest. On October 22, 2007, Blabbermouth.net reported that live singer Sean Farber had left the band. On February 28, 2008, Blabbermouth then reported that Sean Z. (who had filled in after Sean Farber had left) had been named the new singer.

2007 also consisted of more notable tours for Dååth. In January they toured the US with Job For a Cowboy, The Acacia Strain, and Psyopus. In the spring there was a European run with Unearth and Job for a Cowboy. That summer featured not only Ozzfest, but Summer Slaughter dates, a Dying Fetus tour, and various Devildriver off-dates. Later on that year they toured the US and Canada with Dark Funeral and Naglfar. To end the album cycle, Dååth performed three shows in Japan with Zyklon.

The band's third album The Concealers was released on April 21, 2009, by Century Media Records via a partnership with Roadrunner Records. Dååth released one music video from The Concealers which was for the song "Day of Endless Light". There was a good bit of touring behind The Concealers as well. Spring of 2009 featured a full US tour with Dragonforce and Cynic. Summer was the full US and Canada with Goatwhore and Abigail Williams. Later that year, Dååth returned to Europe with Chimaira, Unearth, and Throwdown.

During the break between the final tour for The Concealers album cycle and the writing sessions for the upcoming Dååth album, guitarists Eyal Levi, and Emil Werstler released Avalanche of Worms, an instrumental CD on April 20, 2010, via Magna Carta Records under the artist name Levi/Werstler. Sean Reinert from Cynic played the drums on it.

Dååth released their self-titled fourth studio album in October 2010 via Century Media Records.

In 2011 Emil Werstler would be filling the vacant bass and Sean Zatorsky the vacant keyboard and vocal duties for Chimaira. In 2012 Werstler was officially made the lead guitarist for Chimaira as well as Jeremy Creamer filling the bass duties in Chimaira left vacant by Werstler's promotion.

In May 2022, vocalist Sean Zatorsky revealed the band was recording new material and was hoping to release a new EP later in the year or in early 2023. He also revealed that bassist Jeremy Creamer and guitarist Emil Werstler might perform on the upcoming EP "if they have time", and that drummer Kevin Talley was no longer a member of the band, but they have recruited a new drummer who will perform on the new EP. On August 2, the band revealed that Septicflesh drummer Kerim Lechner would perform drums on the upcoming EP. On August 6, guitarist Emil Werstler confirmed he was no longer a member of the band.

On February 22, 2023, the band announced they had signed to Metal Blade Records and released their first new song in 12 years, "No Rest No End". They also revealed new band members Jesse Zuretti, who would handle orchestration, synth, and guitars, and Dave Marvuglio, acting as session bassist for the band, confirming Jeremy Creamer is no longer in the band.

Members 
Current members
 Eyal Levi – guitar, synthesizer (2000–present)
 Sean Zatorsky – vocals (2008–present)
 Kerim "Krimh" Lechner – drums (2022–present)
 Jesse Zuretti – samples, orchestration, guitars (2022–present)

Former members
 Mike Kameron – keyboard, vocals (2000–2008)
 Jeremy Creamer – bass (2004–2010)
 Emil Werstler – guitar (2004–2010)
 Kris Dale – bass guitar (2004)
 Eric Sanders – drums (2004)
 Sam Cuadra – guitar (2004)
 Corey Brewer – drums (2004)
 Lance Hoskins – bass guitar (2004)
 Matthew Ellis – drums (2004–2005)
 Kevin Talley – drums (2006–2010)
 Sean Farber – vocals (2006–2007)

Timeline

Discography

Studio albums 
 Futility (2004)
 The Hinderers (2007)
 The Concealers (2009)
 Dååth (2010)

Extended plays 
 Dead on the Dance Floor (2007)

Videography 
 "Festival Mass Soulform" – released January 25, 2007
 "Subterfuge" – released February 28, 2007
 "Day of Endless Light" – released July 3, 2009

References

External links 
 
 

American death metal musical groups
Heavy metal musical groups from Georgia (U.S. state)
Roadrunner Records artists
Musical groups established in 2003
Musical quintets